The Eemmeer is a lake situated in the middle of the Netherlands between the provinces of Flevoland,  Utrecht, and North Holland. It measures  and contains one small island, the Dode Hond (Dead Dog). The Eemmeer is one in a series of peripheral lakes used to geohydrologically detach the low-lying polders of Flevoland from higher old mainland. The Eemmeer is connected to the peripheral lakes Gooimeer in the west, at the point where both lakes are crossed by the highway A27 bridge, and the Nijkerkernauw in the east.

Lakes of the Netherlands
Landforms of Flevoland
Landforms of North Holland
Landforms of Utrecht (province)
Blaricum
Zeewolde